Jason Ryan (born 1976) is an Irish Gaelic football manager and former player at senior level for the Waterford county team, as well as for the London county football team and London county hurling team.

Ryan is the former manager of the Kildare and Wexford county teams.

Career
Born in Dungarvan, County Waterford, Ireland, Ryan's playing career brought him to both Ireland and Britain. While studying in St Mary's in Twickenham he played football with Tara and hurling with St Gabriel's, while also lining out with the London senior inter-county teams in both codes. He went on to be a P.E. teacher at Salesian School, Chertsey. On his return to Ireland Ryan joined the De La Salle club, while he also lined out at senior level with the Waterford county football team.

While still a player at club and inter-county levels, Ryan became involved in team management. He had some involvement with various school teams like De La Salle Waterford and Coláiste Chathal Naofa in Dungarvan before joining the Slieverue junior hurling team as physical trainer in 2006. The following year he was appointed trainer of the Clongeen football team in Wexford and helped them claim the county title. Ryan was appointed manager of the Wexford senior football team in November 2007. In September 2012, he stepped down as manager of Wexford. Ryan joined the Kildare GAA Senior Football panel as a coach in December 2012.

He was the manager of the senior Wexford county team from 2007 until 2012 when he stepped down.  

In October 2013, he was appointed as senior Kildare county team manager.

In August 2015, Ryan stepped down as Kildare manager.

References

 

1976 births
Living people
De La Salle Gaelic footballers
Dual players
Gaelic football coaches
Gaelic football managers
Irish expatriate sportspeople in England
Irish schoolteachers
Kildare county football team
London inter-county Gaelic footballers
London inter-county hurlers
People from Dungarvan
St Gabriel's hurlers
Tara Gaelic footballers
Waterford inter-county Gaelic footballers